Dooley Hollow is a valley in Shannon County in the U.S. state of Missouri.

Dooley Hollow has the name of the local Dooley family.

References

Valleys of Shannon County, Missouri
Valleys of Missouri